Lebuh Sentosa is a major highway in Putrajaya, Malaysia. It connects Precinct 11 in the north to the Core Island of Putrajaya in the south.

Lists of interchanges

Highways in Malaysia
Highways in Putrajaya

References